Hyun Jae-Myung (현제명, 玄濟明, 8 December 1902 - 16 October 1960) was a South Korean composer. Hyun composed and conducted the first Korean opera Chunhyang-jeon in 1950, and Prince Hodong in 1958. During the Japanese colonial period, he, like most Koreans, was given a Japanese name based on his Korean one (玄山濟明 Kuroyama Sumiaki).

References

External links
 Encyclopedia of Korean Culture - 현제명
 Doosan Encyclopedia - 현제명

1902 births
1960 deaths
Male classical composers
South Korean opera composers
20th-century classical composers
20th-century male musicians